The Anglican Diocese of Newfoundland was, from its creation in 1839 until 1879, the Diocese of Newfoundland and Bermuda, with the Cathedral of St. John the Baptist at St. John's, Newfoundland, and a chapel-of-ease named Trinity Church in the City of Hamilton in Pembroke Parish, Bermuda (not to be confused either with the Parish church for Pembroke Parish, St. John's, or with Holy Trinity Church, the parish church of Hamilton Parish). Newfoundland and Bermuda had both been parts of British North America until left out of the 1867 Confederation of Canada. In 1842, her jurisdiction was described as "Newfoundland, the Bermudas". In 1879 the Church of England in the British Overseas Territory of Bermuda (since 1978, an extra-provincial diocese of the archbishop of Canterbury re-titled the Anglican Church of Bermuda) was created, but continued to be grouped with the Diocese of Newfoundland under the bishop of Newfoundland and Bermuda until 1919, when Newfoundland and Bermuda each received its own bishop.

In 1976 the Diocese of Newfoundland was reorganised and three autonomous dioceses were created, Eastern Newfoundland and Labrador, Central Newfoundland, and Western Newfoundland.

The three dioceses jointly support Queen's College, other ministries and have many common interests.

Bishops
Aubrey Spencer (1793–1872) diocesan from 1839 - 1843.
Edward Feild (1801–1876) diocesan from 1844 - 1876.
James Kelly  (1832–1907) diocesan from 1876 - 1877.
Llewellyn Jones (1840–1918) diocesan from 1878 - 1917.
William White (1873–1943) diocesan from 1918 - 1942.
Philip Abraham (1897–1955) coadjutor, 1937; diocesan from 1942 - 1955.
John Meaden  diocesan from 1956 - 1965.
Robert Seaborn (1911–1993) diocesan from 1965 - reorganization.
William Legge was suffragan bishop, and became diocesan bishop of Western Newfoundland when the diocese split.

References

External links
Diocese of Central Newfoundland
Anglican Diocese of Eastern Newfoundland and Labrador
Diocese of Western Newfoundland
Queen's College

Newfoundland